Novak (in Serbo-Croatian and Slovene;), Novák (in Hungarian, Czech and Slovak), Nowak or Novack (in German and Polish), is a surname and masculine given name, derived from the Slavic word for "new" (e.g.

It seems to originate, at least by common occurrence, in the province of Upper Silesia, when Germanic settlers moved into the upper Oder river region, the Slavs referred to the "new men" as "Nowaks". Another theory is that "new man" refers to a person who has converted to Christianity or to a new arrival in a city. It was also used for newcomers to an army and as an occupational surname for people who used the slash-and-burn method to create new arable land—novina. It is pronounced almost the same way in most languages, with the stress on the first syllable. The main exception is Slovene, which places the stress on the last syllable.

It is the most common surname in the Czech Republic, Poland, and Slovenia, and the sixth most common in Croatia. It is also found in Romania and Moldova, in the Novac form, and among Ashkenazi Jews in various forms depending on their country of origin.

Spelling
The surname is usually spelled Novák in Czech, Slovak, and Hungarian, Nowak in Polish and German, Novak in Serbo-Croatian, Slovene, Russian, Ukrainian, and Belarusian.

In specific countries

Poland 
As of 2009, Nowak is the most common surname in Poland, having surpassed Kowalski. Its plural is Nowakowie. Nowak is used by both male and female individuals. The archaic feminine version is Nowakowa. Related surnames include Nowakowski (feminine: Nowakowska; plural: Nowakowscy), Nowacki (feminine: Nowacka; plural: Nowaccy), Nowakowicz (gender-neutral), and Nowakiewicz (gender-neutral).

Nowak is the most common surname in nine voivodeships (administrative units) of Poland, and second in another. It is ranked first in Greater Poland Voivodeship (35,011), Silesian Voivodeship (31,838), Lesser Poland Voivodeship (23,671), Łódź Voivodeship (15,460), Lower Silesian Voivodeship (13,217), West Pomeranian Voivodeship (7,444), Opole Voivodeship (5,538), Lubusz Voivodeship (5,444), and Świętokrzyskie Voivodeship (5,538), and second in Subcarpathian Voivodeship (9,301).

There are two noble families of Polish origin with the surname Nowak:
 One family appeared in Silesia in the 15th century. It included Anatol Nowak (died 1456), Archbishop of Wrocław. A branch of this family became barons in Bohemia in 1660.
 One family appeared in Masovia around 1750. This family included Antoni and Józef Nowak, generals in the Polish army that served Napoleon, and Aleksander Nowak, a general of the Polish forces during the November Uprising in 1831 against Russia.

Czech Republic and Slovakia 
Novák is widespread in the Czech Republic and Slovakia. In both countries, the feminine form is Nováková. It is the most common surname in the Czech Republic.

Slovenia 
Novak is the most common surname in Slovenia with more than 11,000 sharing it. There are however significant variations between regions: it is very common in central Slovenia (in the regions around Ljubljana and Celje), as well as in parts of southern Slovenia and eastern Slovenia (Lower Carniola, Prekmurje). It is much less common in northern and western Slovenia; in the Goriška region on the border with Italy, it is quite rare. The rank of the surname Novak in the Slovenian statistical regions: 1st in the Central Slovenia Statistical Region (3,422) and Savinja Statistical Region (1,380); 2nd in the Southeast Slovenia Statistical Region (1,231) and Mura Statistical Region (1,040); 3rd in the Drava Statistical Region (1,732); 5th in the Upper Carniola Statistical Region (963)
and Lower Sava Statistical Region (380); 6th in the Coastal–Karst Statistical Region (228); 8th in the Central Sava Statistical Region (192); 10th in the Carinthia Statistical Region (238); 11th in the Inner Carniola–Karst Statistical Region (228); 131st in the Gorizia Statistical Region (171).

Other countries 
In Croatia, Novak is the sixth most common surname.

In Serbia and Montenegro, Novak is a given name, while Novaković is found as a common surname.

In Germany, Nowak is 159th (c. 31,000) and Noack is 270th (c. 22,000), together with different spellings (c. 64,000), with some concentration in the Ruhr area, around Salzgitter and Lüchow-Dannenberg and as Noack in Lusatia.

People

Novak and Novák surname

A–J
 Alexander Novak (born 1971), Russian politician
 Anatole Novak (1937–2022), French bicycle racer
 Andriy Novak (born 1988), Ukrainian footballer
 Anthony Novak (born 1994), Canadian soccer player
 Anthony Novak, plaintiff in Novak v. City of Parma
 Arne Novák (1880–1939), Czech literary historian and critic
 Augustin Novák, a World War I flying ace
 B. J. Novak (born 1979), American writer, comedian and actor known for The Office
 Barbara Novak (born 1922), American art historian
 Brandon Novak (born 1978), American skateboarder
 Brett Novak, an American filmmaker and director
 David Novak (disambiguation), several persons
 Dennis Novak (born 1993), Austrian tennis player
 Dezső Novák (1939–2014), Hungarian footballer
 Doug Novak, women's basketball coach for Mississippi State
 Dragutin Novak (1892–1978), Croatian aviator
 Džoni Novak (born 1969), Slovenian former footballer
 Emil Novák, Czech snowboarder
 Éva Novák-Gerard (1930–2005), Hungarian swimmer
 Evelin Novak (born 1965), Croatian operatic soprano
 Ferenc Novák (born 1969), Hungarian canoer and Olympic champion
 Filip Novák (born 1982), Czech professional ice hockey defenceman
 Franz Novak (1913–1983), Austrian SS-Hauptsturmführer
 Gabi Novak (born 1936), Croatian pop singer
 Grga Novak (1888–1978), Croatian historian, archaeologist and geographer
 Grigory Novak (1919–1980), Ukrainian Olympic weightlifter
 Ilona Novák (1925–2019), Hungarian swimmer and Olympic champion
 Ján Novák (1921–1984), Czech composer
 Ján Novák (born 1985), Slovak footballer
 Ján Novák (born 1979), Czech professional ice hockey player
 Jane Novak (1896–1990), actress in silent films
 Jeff Novak (born 1967), former American footballer
 Jim Novak (1955–2018), American comic book letterer
 Jiří Novák (born 1975), Czech former tennis player
 Joe Novak (born 1945), retired college football coach
 John Novak (born 1955), actor
 John Philip Novak (born 1946), American politician
 Joseph D. Novak (born 1930), American educator

K–Z
 Karel Novák, Czech slalom canoeist
 Katalin Novák, Hungarian president
 Kate Novak, American fantasy writer
 Kayvan Novak (born 1978), British-Iranian actor
 Kevin Novak (born 1982), American soccer player
 Kim Novak (born 1933), American actress
 Krysia Nowak (born 1948), British artist
 Ladislav Novák (1931–2011), Czech football player and manager
 Laila Novak (born 1942), Swedish model and actress
 Ljudmila Novak (born 1959), Slovenian politician and Member of the European Parliament
 Martin Novák, Czech ice hockey player
 Matěj Novák (born 1989), Czech figure skater
 Mel Novak (born 1942), American actor
 Michael Novak (1933–2017), conservative American Roman Catholic philosopher and diplomat
 Michael Novak (footballer), Austrian footballer
 Mike Novak (1915–1978), American National Basketball League player
 Mirjam Novak (born 1981), German actress and screenwriter
 Miroslav Novák (1907–2000), Czech Hussite bishop
 Nick Novak (born 1981), National Football League placekicker
 Otto Novák (1902–1984), Czech footballer
 Petr Novák (disambiguation)
 Robert Novak (1931–2009), American journalist and conservative political commentator
 Rudolph Novak, American gymnast
 Slobodan Novak (1924–2016), Croatian writer
 Slobodan Prosperov Novak (born 1951), Croatian literary historian
 Štefan Novák (1879–1932), Greek Catholic Bishop of the Eparchy of Prešov
 Steve Novak (born 1983), basketball player
 Tom Novak, marketing professor
 Tommy Novak (born 1997), American Ice Hockey Player
 Viktor Novak (1889–1977), Yugoslav historian
 Vilmos Aba-Novák (1894–1941), Hungarian painter and graphic artist
 Vítězslav Novák (1870–1949), Czech composer
 Viveca Novak, American journalist
 Vjenceslav Novak (1859–1905), Croatian writer
 Vladimír Novák (painter) (born 1947), Czech painter
 Vladimír Novák (skier) (1904–1986), Czechoslovak Nordic skier
 Zbyněk Novák (born 1983), Czech ice hockey player

Novakov surname
Andrey Novakov (born 1988), Bulgarian politician
Anna Novakov, Serbian-American art historian and curator
Boncho Novakov  (born 1935), Bulgarian cyclist
Tihomir Novakov (1929–2015), Serbian-born American physicist

Nováková surname
 Daniela Trandžíková-Nováková (born 1956), Slovak handball player
 Eva Nováková (born 1938), Czech politician
 Ivana Nováková (born 1965), Czech basketball player
 Kristýna Badinková Nováková (born 1983), Czech film and television actress
 Petra Nováková (born 1993), Czech skier
 Soňa Nováková (born 1975), Czech female beach volleyball player
 Šárka Nováková (born 1971), Czech high jumper
 Teréza Nováková (1853–1912), Czech feminist author, editor, and ethnographer
 Vratislava Nováková, Czechoslovak slalom canoer

Nowak surname
 , Academy Award–nominated director of Isaac in America: A Journey with Isaac Bashevis Singer
 Anton Nowak (1865–1932), Austrian artist
 Bartosz Nowak, Polish footballer
 Cécile Nowak (born 1967), French judoka
 Henry J. Nowak (born 1935), member of United States House of Representatives (1975–1993)
 Jan Nowak-Jeziorański (1914–2005), Polish journalist and World War II hero
 Jerzy Nowak, Polish actor
 Jerzy Robert Nowak, Polish historian
 Józef Nowak (1925–1984), Polish actor
 Julian Nowak (1865–1946), Polish physician, veterinarian, bacteriologist, and politician
 Katarzyna Nowak, Polish tennis player
 Kazimierz Nowak (1897–1937), Polish traveler
 Leopold Nowak (1904–1991), Austrian musicologist
 Lisa Nowak (born 1963), American astronaut
 Łukasz Nowak (born 1988), Polish athlete
 Marco Nowak, German ice hockey player
 Mark Nowak (born 1964), American poet and writer
 Manfred Nowak (born 1950), United Nations Special Rapporteur on Torture
 Martin Nowak (born 1965), Austrian mathematical biologist
 Mateusz Nowak, Polish cyclist
 Oskar Nowak (ice hockey) (1913–?), Austrian ice hockey player
 Piotr Nowak (born 1964), Polish footballer and manager
 Sylwia Nowak, Polish ice dancer
 Tadeusz Nowak, Polish footballer
 Teresa Nowak (born 1942), Polish athlete
 Tim Nowak, German decathlete
 Wanda Nowak (born 1913), Austrian athlete
 Zdzisław Nowak (1906–1996), Polish athlete
 Zenon Nowak (1905–1980), Polish trade union activist and politician

Novak given name
 Novak Djokovic (born 1987), Serbian tennis player
 Starina Novak (1530–1601), Serbian brigand and rebel
 Novak Grebostrek (fl. 1312), Serbian commander
 Novak Karaljuk (fl. 1404), Serbian commander
 Novak Kilibarda (born 1934), Montenegrin politician
 Novak Martinović (born 1985), Serbian footballer
  (1928–1995), Serbian writer and journalist
 Novak Radonić (1826–1890), Serbian painter
 Novak Roganović (1932–2008), Serbian footballer
 Novak Tomić (1936–2003), Serbian footballer

Characters
 Allie Novak, character from the Australian drama series Wentworth
 Arpad Novack, from Illatszertár (Parfumerie), the Hungarian play used as inspiration for The Shop Around the Corner
 Barbara Novak, in the movie Down with Love played by Renée Zellweger
 Billy Novak, in the Amazon television series The Collection
 Bobby Novak, from the American television series Pearson
 Casey Novak, in Law & Order: SVU
 Dazzle Novak, in the television series Moonbeam City
 Georg Nowack, a character from the musical She Loves Me inspired by The Shop Around the Corner
 Holland and Dewey Novak, characters in the television series Eureka Seven
 James Novak, a character on the television series Scandal
 Jessica Novak, eponymous character of American drama television series
 Jimmy Novak, his wife Amelia and his daughter Claire Novak, from the television series Supernatural
 John Novak, protagonist of the television show Mr. Novak
 Klara Novak, a character on The Shop Around the Corner, played by Margaret Sullavan
 Lindsey Novak, recurring character in the Stargate Atlantis television series
 Pat Novak, in The Novak Element in the movie RoboCop
 Pat Novak, played by Jack Webb in the old-time radio program Pat Novak, for Hire
 Sydney Novak, played by Sophia Lillis in the Netflix series I Am Not Okay With This
 Tom Nowak, in the movie Test pilota Pirxa
 Tommy Nowak, in the movie Pink Cadillac, played by Clint Eastwood
 Trishka Novak, character in the 2011 video game Bulletstorm
 Zig Novak, character on television series Degrassi

See also 
 Nováček
 Noak (disambiguation)

References 

Croatian surnames
Czech-language surnames
Polish-language surnames
Serbian surnames
Slavic-language surnames
Slovak-language surnames
Slovene-language surnames
Jewish surnames
Croatian masculine given names
Serbian masculine given names

cs:Novák
sk:Novák (priezvisko)